The 2021 Stroud District Council election took place on 6 May 2021 to elect members of Stroud District Council in England. This was on the same day as other local elections.

Summary

Election result

|-

Ward results

Amberley & Woodchester

Berkeley Vale

Bisley

Cainscross

Cam East

Cam West

Chalford

Coaley & Uley

Dursley

Hardwicke

Kingswood

Minchinhampton

Nailsworth

Painswick & Upton

Randwick, Whiteshill & Ruscombe

Rodborough

Severn

Stonehouse

Stroud Central

Stroud Farmhill & Paganhill

Stroud Slade

Stroud Trinity

Stroud Uplands

Stroud Valley

The Stanleys

Thrupp

Wotton-under-Edge

References

Stroud
2021
2020s in Gloucestershire